The World President of the Junior Chamber International is elected annually at the JCI World Congress.

References

Junior Chamber International
Junior Chamber International